Acrocercops symmetropa is a moth of the family Gracillariidae. It is known from Indonesia (Java).

References

symmetropa
Moths of Asia
Moths described in 1939